Hoseason Glacier is a 12 mi long glacier, flowing north into the sea between West Stack and East Stack, 15 mi east of Edward VIII Bay, East Antarctica. Roughly mapped by Norwegian cartographers from aerial photos taken by the Lars Christensen Expedition, 1936–37. Visited in 1954 by an Australian National Antarctic Research Expeditions (ANARE) sledging party and named by ANCA for Richard Hoseason of Australian National Antarctic Research Expeditions (ANARE), who perished on a field trip at Heard Island in 1952.

See also
 List of glaciers in the Antarctic
 Glaciology

References

Glaciers of Kemp Land